Hugh Beasley is a former professional Australian rules footballer who played for the Brisbane Lions in the Australian Football League (AFL). He played his first game in round 10 of the 2015 season. He was delisted by Brisbane at the conclusion of the 2016 season. In 2019 he won a VFL premiership with Richmond.

Statistics

|- style="background-color: #EAEAEA"
! scope="row" style="text-align:center" | 2015
|
| 48 || 6 || 0 || 2 || 28 || 31 || 59 || 16 || 16 || 0.0 || 0.3 || 4.7 || 5.2 || 9.8 || 2.7 || 2.7
|-
! scope="row" style="text-align:center" | 2016
|
| 48 || 0 || — || — || — || — || — || — || — || — || — || — || — || — || — || —
|- class="sortbottom"
! colspan=3| Career
! 6
! 0
! 2
! 28
! 31
! 59
! 16
! 16
! 0.0
! 0.3
! 4.7
! 5.2
! 9.8
! 2.7
! 2.7
|}

References

External links 

1995 births
Living people
Brisbane Lions players
Oakleigh Chargers players
Box Hill Football Club players
Australian rules footballers from Victoria (Australia)